Vic's Grill was a British television programme which aired on the BBC during 1951. It starred Vic Wise. All the episodes are missing, and believed lost. The show aired live. Though the technology to record live television was developed in late 1947, it was very rarely used by the BBC until around 1953, as it was considered of unacceptable quality.

References

External links
Vic's Grill on IMDb

1950s British comedy television series
1951 British television series debuts
1951 British television series endings
Lost BBC episodes
BBC Television shows
Black-and-white British television shows
BBC television comedy
British live television series